Xu Ke (1869–1928) was a Chinese author. He wrote an "unofficial" history of the Qing Dynasty, published in 48 volumes in 1917. Author and UC Irvine professor Yong Chen said the book "provides an encyclopedic coverage of life during the Qing Dynasty."

References

1869 births
1928 deaths
Qing dynasty historians
Republic of China historians
Writers from Hangzhou
Historians from Zhejiang
20th-century Chinese historians